Rajshri Rani Shukla Jain is an Indian TV actress best known for her titular portrayal of Suhani in Star Plus show Suhani Si Ek Ladki.

Career
Rani made her acting debut in 2012 by starring in Drashti Dhami's show Madhubala – Ek Ishq Ek Junoon and Savdhaan India as Gauri. In the same year 2012, she also portrayed the role of Laxmi's Sister Pallavi in DD National's Bin Bitiya Swarg Adhoora. in 2013, she was cast in another episode of Savdhaan India as Gomti. In 2014, she guest starred on Haunted Nights and CID. In June 2014, she was cast as in the television series Suhani Si Ek Ladki as Suhani. In April 2018, she joined Star Plus's Ikyawann as Sarthi Mishra. After a brief role in Yehh Jadu Hai Jinn Ka, she was also seen as Rupa Raunak Rajput in Namak Issk Ka, on Colors TV.
Currently she is seen in Star Plus show Imlie as Arpita Rathod.

Personal life
Rani's family consists of her parents and brother. Her mother died in 2014 due to heart attack. Rani was previously married to Vineet Pandey from 2008-2018. On 20 November 2020, she married her former co-star Gaurav Mukesh Jain in Gwalior.

Filmography

Television

References

External links
 Rajshri Rani on IMDb

Living people
Indian television actresses
21st-century Indian actresses
Actresses in Hindi television
People from Fatehpur, Uttar Pradesh
1988 births